West Malling (historically Town Malling) is a market town in the Tonbridge and Malling district of Kent, England. It has a population of 2,590.

Landmarks
West Malling contains several historic buildings, including St Leonard's Tower, a Norman keep built by Bishop Gundulf (bishop between 1077 and 1108). He also built the White Tower of the Tower of London, the castles of Rochester and Colchester, and the Priory and Cathedral of Rochester. In c.1090 Gundulf founded St. Mary's Abbey in West Malling for Benedictine nuns. This historic site contains significant buildings from the Norman, medieval, Tudor and Georgian eras. There is also a Grade II* Listed 1966 abbey church which is used by the Anglican Benedictine nuns who have made Malling Abbey their home since 1916.

Other buildings of interest in West Malling include the Prior's House, once a residence for those with leprosy; Ford House, over 600 years old; a mainly Georgian High Street; the Swan Hotel, an 18th-century coaching inn (Grade II listed), and Went House, built c.1720 and noted for its elegant brickwork. Manor Park Country Park is just to the south of the town, close to St Leonard's Tower and Douce's Manor, whose grounds the park once comprised.

In about 1791 the artist J. M. W. Turner painted a watercolour of 'St Mary's Abbey and an ornamental waterfall' on Swan St, that remains in place today.

Places of worship include the Anglican St Mary's Church and West Malling Baptist Church, built in 1836.

Kings Hill

This new parish is a mixed residential housing estate and commercial development formed from parts of West Malling, Mereworth, East Malling and Wateringbury. The 2004 Wealth of the Nation report lists Kings Hill as having the highest average income and the highest proportion of households earning more than £100,000 per annum in Great Britain.

Transport

West Malling is some 35 miles (56 km) from central London, next to the main road between London and the coastal ferry ports of Folkestone and Dover and with good links by road and rail; the area has become a popular commuter location.

Road
Originally established on the main road to London from the coast, West Malling is about a mile (1½ km) from Junction 4 of the M20, and from Junction 2 of the M26 which leads on to the M25, encircling London.

Air

In the 1930s, Maidstone Airport was established two miles from the town, at Kings Hill. During the Second World War, RAF fighters were posted to the then-named RAF West Malling, and several US Navy squadrons were located there during the 1960s. After closure as an operational airfield in 1967, several commercial air-based activities moved onto the site, and a number of popular airshows took place – the last was in 1987. By then, work had started to convert the area to non-flying use, developing into the new parish of Kings Hill.

Rail

West Malling station, situated on the outskirts of the town, provides a regular service, operated by Southeastern Trains, up to Victoria, and down to Maidstone and Ashford. Journeys into London take around one hour. Direct services to London Bridge and Cannon Street were withdrawn in December 2009.

With the recent development of Kings Hill, the station was renamed "West Malling for Kings Hill", and in 2007 road access was provided from the West Malling bypass, taking commuter traffic away from the High Street.

Local media

Newspapers
West Malling is covered by the Malling edition of the Kent Messenger, published by the KM Group. There is also a King's Hill edition of the Sevenoaks Chronicle.

Radio
The local radio station for West Malling is KMFM Maidstone. The county-wide stations BBC Radio Kent, Heart and Gold can also be received in the town.

Sport
West Malling is reputed to be the site of the first recorded cricket match in Kent. The Old County Ground, off Norman Road, was once the home of inter-county cricket in Kent, and it is known that in 1705, "West of Kent" played Chatham at Malling.

The setting for the cricket match between All Muggleton and Dingley Dell in Charles Dickens's The Pickwick Papers is reputed to be based on an amalgamation of the grounds at West Malling and Maidstone. There is a resemblance to West Malling in the original illustration of the match, a version of which featured on the back of the £10 banknote featuring Dickens, first circulated on 29 April 1992. Dickens, however, was a regular visitor to Dingley Hall in the village of Dingley, Northamptonshire. Here he would have encountered an annual cricket match against a team formed of men with the name Muggleton, from the next village of Wilbaston. Dingley Dell is an area just south of the village, steep and wooded which may instead have been the model for Dickens' "Dingley Dell".

Kings Hill golf course was founded in 1995 and is open to guests and visitors.

Cultural references
In 1967, The Beatles' Magical Mystery Tour was filmed around West Malling, including in the High Street and at the airfield.

Notable residents
Aretas Akers-Douglas, 1st Viscount Chilston, Conservative politician and Home Secretary 1902–1905. Born at St. Mary's Abbey, West Malling in 1851.
John Downman, artist. Lived in Went House, West Malling from 1804.
Wing Commander Guy Gibson, V.C., leader of The Dambusters, was stationed at RAF West Malling in 1941. His signature is preserved on the ceiling of the cellar at Douce's Manor, used as an Officers' Mess by the Airmen.
Tony Hudgell, fundraiser, lives with his parents in Kings Hill.
William Perfect, surgeon, obstetrician and pioneer of the treatment of mental illness. Lived in West Malling from 1756 until his death in 1809.
Lt. Col. A.D. Wintle, M.C., famous eccentric and soldier. First layman to win a unanimous verdict in the House of Lords. Lived in Coldharbour House in West Malling.

References

External links

 Panoramic views of West Malling (BBC)
 Malling Action Partnership, a community-based partnership leading to a community-developed vision for the future of West Malling as a market town
 Geograph photo of the Cricket Ground

 
Towns in Kent
Market towns in Kent
Civil parishes in Kent
Tonbridge and Malling